Julian Sas-Kuilovsky (1 May 1826 – 4 May 1900) was the Metropolitan Archbishop of the Ukrainian Greek Catholic Church from 1899 until his death in 1900.

Life
He studied philosophy in the Lviv University which expelled him due his participation to the revolutionary risings which led to the revolution of 1848. After the defeats in 1848, he followed as sotnik (Captain) the general Józef Bem in his revolutionary campaign till the final defeat of the Battle of Segesvár.
After a heavy wound on the face, he went to Paris where he studied in the Saint-Sulpice Seminary and on April 1, 1854 he was ordained as a priest.

Julian Sas-Kuilovsky served as priest one year in the island of Corfu and after an amnesty in 1857 he could return in Galicia, where he served in a parish near Przemyśl from 1859 to 1884, where from  1883 to 1884 he served also as rector of the Greek Catholic Seminary. On June 26, 1890 he was consecrated auxiliary bishop of the  Eparchy of Przemyśl by Metropolitan Sylvester Sembratovych. On 3 August 1891 he was appointed bishop of Stanyslaviv (now Ivano-Frankivsk). He did not won sympathy among the Ukrainians because of his pro-Polish attitude.

At end 1898 he was appointed Metropolitan Archbishop of Lviv, i.e. the primate of the Ukrainian Greek Catholic Church. His appointment was later confirmed by Pope Leo XIII on June 19, 1899 and he was enthroned on August 30, 1899. Julian Sas-Kuilovsky died a few months later, on May 4, 1900 in Lviv.

Notes

Sources
 Cz. Lechicki, Kuiłowski Julian in Polish Biographical Dictionary, volume X
 Dmytro Błażejowśkyj, Historical sematism of the Eparchy of Peremysl including the Apostolic Administration of Lemkivscyna (1828-1939), Lviv 1995

1826 births
1900 deaths
Ukrainian nobility
People from Lviv Oblast
People from the Kingdom of Galicia and Lodomeria
Metropolitans of Galicia (1808-2005)